Messex, Colorado is a virtual ghost town in Washington County, Colorado. Its population in the 2010 census was 2, but has been several hundred in the past. Settled in the 1860s as a "Wild West" town, it became for a time a place where German immigrants grew sugar beets. In the 1990s, the population was about a dozen people, but it had declined to just 2 people by 2010.

The community was named for Joe Messex, a railroad official.

References

Unincorporated communities in Washington County, Colorado
Unincorporated communities in Colorado